Microhyla heymonsi, also known as the dark-sided chorus frog or the Taiwan rice frog, is a species of narrow-mouthed frog found in northeastern India, southern China, Taiwan, and Southeast Asia south to the Malay Peninsula and Sumatra as well as the Great Nicobar Island. It was originally described from Taiwan.

As microhylids in general, Microhyla heymonsi is a small frog: males reach  and females  in snout-vent length. The dorsal colour is pinkish or greyish above with a black lateral band extending from the snout tip to the groin and entirely covering the sides of the head. It inhabits a variety of disturbed areas as well as secondary vegetation. It breeds in temporary rain puddles, paddy fields, ditches, marshes and slow-flowing streams.

Photos

References

heymonsi
Fauna of the Andaman and Nicobar Islands
Amphibians of Cambodia
Frogs of China
Frogs of India
Amphibians of Indonesia
Amphibians of Laos
Amphibians of Malaysia
Amphibians of Myanmar
Amphibians of Singapore
Amphibians of Taiwan
Amphibians of Thailand
Amphibians of Vietnam
Amphibians described in 1911
Taxa named by Theodor Vogt